Sallustio Bandini (19 April 1677 – 8 June 1760) was an Italian archdeacon, economist, and politician.

He was an advocate of free trade, and removal of local feudal tariffs and tolls. He wrote an influential piece on this subject, titled Discorso Economico sopra la Maremma di Siena, published posthumously in 1775. Approximately two years before his death, Bandini donated his private library to the University of Siena, under the agreement that the almost 3000 volumes would be made publicly available. From this donation the Biblioteca della Sapienza was formed, now known as Biblioteca Comunale degli Intronati.

Early life
Bandini was born Sallustio Antonio Bandini in Siena to a prominent local family. His father was Patrizio Bandini and his mother was Caterina Piccolomini di Modanella, a member of the influential Piccolomini nobility. He was their third son.

Legacy
Bandini is memorialised for his enlightened discourse on economics with a statue in the centre of Siena's Piazza Salimbeni, by the main entrance to Banca Monte dei Paschi di Siena, who commissioned the work. The statue was completed by Italian sculptor Tito Sarrocchi in 1880, more than a century after Bandini's death.

References

1677 births
1760 deaths
Archdeacons
Italian economists
18th-century Italian writers
18th-century Italian male writers
Writers from Siena